Richard Blackburne M.D. F.R.C.P. (b. 1652) was an English physician and writer.

Blackburne was born in London in 1652, and was educated at Trinity College, Cambridge, where he took his degree of B.A. in 1669. ‘ He was entered on the physic line at Leyden University, 23 May 1676, being then twenty-four years of age, and he graduated doctor of medicine in that university, where his thesis was published as ‘Disputatio medica inauguralis de Sanguificatione,' &c., 8vo, Lugduni Batavorum, 1676. About the year 1681 Dr. Blackburne co-operated with John Aubrey, who says that he was ‘one of the College of Physicians, and practiseth yearly at Tunbridge Wells,’ to bring into public repute for their curative properties the chalybeate springs discovered by Aubrey in 1666 at Seend near Devizes, and which Dr. Blackburne declared ‘to be of the nature and virtue of those at Tunbridge, and altogether as good;’ but ‘it was about 1688 before they became to be frequented’  Blackburne was admitted an honorary fellow of the Royal College of Physicians of London, 25 June 1685, and, being created a fellow of the college by the charter of King James II, was admitted as such at the extraordinary comitia of 12 April 1687, and was censor in 1688. The time of his death is unknown. Dr. Blackburne had a great regard and admiration for Thomas Hobbes of Malmesbury, and it is probable that he wrote the short Latin memoir sometimes referred to Hobbes himself, entitled Thomæ Hobbes Angli Malmesburiensis Philosophi Vita. This short ‘Life’ of the philosopher has also been attributed to Ralph Bathurst, dean of Bath. Dr. Blackburne certainly wrote a Latin supplement to the short ‘Life,' entitled Vitae Hobbianie Auctarium, the first sentence of which supplies the chief evidence of his authorship of the ‘Life.’ Both these works would seem to have been derived from a larger and fuller ‘Life’ in manuscript written in English by John Aubrey, and used with the knowledge and consent of the latter, and possibly with the assistance of Hobbes himself. The ‘Vita,' the ‘Auctarium,’ and the autobiographic Latin verses, ‘Thomæ Hobbes Malmesburiensis Vita Carmine expressa, Authore Seipso,’ were issued together in a volume inscribed to William, earl of Devonshire, and bearing on its title-page the mystifying imprint ‘Carolopoli: Apud Eleutherium Anglicum sub signo Veritatis, MDCLXXXI.' The penultimate page gives the place of production, ‘Londini: Apud Guil. Cooke, ad Insigne Viridis Draconis juxta portam vulgò dictam Temple Bar.' These productions form the basis of the ‘Life’ prefixed to the first collection of The Moral and Political Works of Thomas Hobbes of Malmesbury, &c., fol. London, 1750.

References

1652 births
17th-century English medical doctors